Ko Jin-young (born 7 July 1995), also known as Jin Young Ko, is a South Korean professional golfer who plays on the LPGA Tour. By age 22 years, she had won 10 times on the LPGA of Korea Tour, was second at the 2015 Ricoh Women’s British Open, and had won the 2017 LPGA KEB Hana Bank Championship.

Having become a member of the LPGA Tour for the 2018 season, she won her opening tournament in February – the ISPS Handa Women's Australian Open – as only the second player in LPGA history to win in her first tournament as a Tour member. With 13 top-10 finishes out of 25 tournaments played in 2018, she was named the LPGA Rookie of the Year, and completed the 2018 season as the 10th-ranked female player in the world.

In 2019, she won her first two LPGA major championships at the ANA Inspiration and the Evian Championship. Ko completed the 2019 season with the official money title ($2,773,894), the Vare Trophy for the lowest scoring average (69.06), and was named LPGA Player of the Year. In 2020, she won the LPGA official money title ($1,667,925) having played in only four tournaments due to the COVID-19 pandemic, and finished the season as the number one ranked player in the world. In 2021, Ko again won the official money title and the LPGA Player of the Year.

Professional career

2013–2017
Having become a professional in 2013 at age 18, Ko won 10 times on the LPGA of Korea Tour over the period 2014 to 2017, winning the Nefs Masterpiece in August 2014 as her first professional victory. In 2015, she was second at the Ricoh Women's British Open. Ko won the 2017 LPGA KEB Hana Bank Championship, after which she announced her plans to join the LPGA Tour in 2018.

2018
Ko played in 25 LPGA Tour events in 2018, missing only one cut and finishing in the top 10 of 13 tournaments. In February, she won the ISPS Handa Women's Australian Open. For the 2018 season, the LPGA named Ko the Louise Suggs Rolex Rookie of the Year.

2019
On 24 March 2019, Ko won the Bank of Hope Founders Cup on the LPGA Tour, and on 7 April 2019, she won her first LPGA major championship – the ANA Inspiration. The victory elevated Ko to number one in the Women's World Golf Rankings.

On 28 July 2019, Ko clinched her second major title of the season, firing a final round 4-under 67 in the rain to win the Evian Championship by two shots with a 15-under total of 269.

On 25 August 2019, Ko won the Canadian Women's Open in Aurora, Ontario. She shot a tournament record −26 (262) and won by 5 strokes. She did not make a bogey for the entire 72 hole tournament. Ko went bogey-free for a tour-record 114 holes, ending her streak at the Cambia Portland Classic.

Having won the season's money title and Vare Trophy for lowest scoring average, Ko was named the LPGA Rolex Player of the Year for 2019.

2020
On 20 December 2020, Ko won the season-ending CME Group Tour Championship in Naples, Florida and the LPGA Tour's money title with only four starts.

2021
Between July and October 2021 in the United States, Ko won the Volunteers of America Classic in The Colony, Texas, the Portland Classic in West Linn, Oregon, and the Cognizant Founders Cup in West Caldwell, New Jersey. By shooting 66 in her final round at the Founders Cup, she tied Annika Sörenstam's 16-year-old record of 14 consecutive rounds in the 60s. Ko's streak began in the final round of the Evian Championship in July, enabling two wins, a second-place finish, and a tie for sixth in the four tournaments of the streak.

Later in October 2021, Ko won the BMW Ladies Championship in South Korea for her fourth win of the year, 11th overall on the LPGA Tour, and the 200th victory on the LPGA by a South Korean. Ko is the fifth South Korean with at least 10 career LPGA victories. The victory at the BMW Ladies Championship re-established Ko as the world number one in the official women's golf ranking as of October 25, but the 8 November ranking dropped her to #2, a fraction of an average point per event (9.028 to 9.032) behind Nelly Korda, because the calculations are over a two-year rolling average.

In November 2021, Ko successfully defended her title at the CME Group Tour Championship in Naples, Florida. She also won the Race to the CME Globe, Player of the Year, and topped the money list.

2022
In March 2022, Ko won the HSBC Women's World Championship in Singapore. The was her 13th career LPGA Tour win and sixth win in her last 10 starts since June 2021.

On 31 October, without her or Atthaya Thitikul playing in a tournament the prior week (24 October), she fell to world No. 2 on her average points from 7.25 to 7.09, to make Thitikul (7.20 to 7.13) become the new world No. 1 in the women's golf rankings.

2023
Ko successfully defended her HSBC Women's World Championship title in Singapore on 5 March, defeating Nelly Korda by two strokes.

Professional wins (25)

LPGA of Korea Tour wins (12)

1 Co-sanctioned with LPGA Tour

LPGA Tour wins (14)

 
1 Co-sanctioned with KLPGA Tour

LPGA Tour playoff record (1–0)

Other wins (1)
2016 World Ladies Championship - team (with Lee Jung-min)

Major championships

Wins (2)

Results timeline
Results not in chronological order before 2022.

CUT = missed the half-way cut
T = tied

Summary

Most consecutive cuts made – 15 (2018 Evian – 2022 Evian)
Longest streak of top-10s – 5 (2019 Evian – 2021 U.S. Open)

LPGA Tour career summary

^ Official as of 5 March 2023

* Includes matchplay and other tournaments without a cut.

World ranking
Position in Women's World Golf Rankings at the end of each calendar year.

^ as of 6 March 2023

Team appearances
Professional
The Queens (representing Korea): 2015, 2016 (winners), 2017

Awards
2018 LPGA Rookie of the Year
2019 LPGA Vare Trophy for lowest scoring average
2019 Rolex Annika Major Award
2019 LPGA leading money winner
2019 LPGA Player of the Year
2020 LPGA leading money winner
2021 LPGA Player of the Year
2021 LPGA leading money winner

See also
List of golfers with most LPGA Tour wins
List of LPGA major championship winning golfers

References

External links
LPGA Tour of Korea profile 

Profile on SeoulSisters.com

South Korean female golfers
LPGA of Korea Tour golfers
LPGA Tour golfers
Winners of LPGA major golf championships
Olympic golfers of South Korea
Golfers at the 2020 Summer Olympics
Golfers from Seoul
1995 births
Living people
21st-century South Korean women
20th-century South Korean women